Come Walk with Me may refer to:

 Come Walk with Me, 1997 album by Oleta Adams
 Come Walk with Me, 1972 album by Debby Kerner
 "Come Walk with Me", a 2013 song by M.I.A.
 "(Do You Wanna) Come Walk with Me?", song by Isobel Cambell from the album Ballad of the Broken Seas
 Come Walk With Me: A Memoir, autobiography by métis author Beatrice Mosionier

See also
 Walk with Me (disambiguation)